Bree Kristel Clarke is an Australian-born music/celebrity portrait photographer who has starred in VH1 and MTV reality shows.

She was a tour manager for Skrillex She shot a PSA for Tom DeLonge.

References

External links
 
 

Australian photographers
Living people
Australian women artists
Year of birth missing (living people)